This is a list of rotorcraft, including helicopters, autogyros, rotor kites and convertiplanes.

A

A-B Helicopters 
A-B Helicopters A/W 95

American Aircraft International 
 AAI Penetrator

Aero 
Aero HC-2 Heli Baby

Aero-Astra 
 Aero-Astra Okhotnik 1

Aero Eli Serviza
Aero Eli Serviza Yo-Yo 222

Aerokopter 
 Aerokopter AK1-3 Sanka

Aerospace General 
Aerospace General Mini-Copter

Aérospatiale 
Aérospatiale Alouette II
Aérospatiale Alouette III
Aérospatiale Cougar
Aérospatiale Dauphin
Aérospatiale Djinn
Aérospatiale Ecureuil
Aérospatiale Gazelle
Aérospatiale Lama
Aérospatiale Puma
Aérospatiale Super Frelon
Aérospatiale Super Puma

Aerotécnica
 Aerotécnica AC-11
 Aerotécnica AC-12
 Aerotécnica AC-14

Agusta 
Agusta AZ.101G
Agusta AB.102
Agusta A103
Agusta A104 Helicar
Agusta A105
Agusta A106
Agusta A109
Agusta A115
Agusta A119 Koala
Agusta A129 Mangusta

AgustaWestland 
AgustaWestland AW101 
AgustaWestland CH-149 Cormorant
AgustaWestland AW109
AgustaWestland AW109 Grand
AgustaWestland AW119 Koala
AgustaWestland AW139
AgustaWestland AW149
AgustaWestland AW159
AgustaWestland AW169
AgustaWestland AW189

Air & Space 
 Air & Space 18A Flymobil

Air Command
Air Command Commander
Air Command Commander 147A
Air Command Commander Elite
Air Command Commander Side-By-Side
Air Command Commander Sport
Air Command Commander Tandem
Air Command Tandem

Airbus Helicopters 
 Airbus Helicopters H160
 Airbus Helicopters H175
 Airbus Helicopters X6

Airmaster Helicopters 
 Airmaster H2-B1

Amax Engineering
Amax Double Eagle TT
Amax Eagle
Amax Eagle TT

American Air Jet 
 American Air Jet American

American Helicopter 
 XH-26 Jet Jeep
 XA-5 Top Sergeant
 A-6 Buck Private

American Sportscopter
 American Sportscopter Ultrasport 254
 American Sportscopter Ultrasport 331
 American Sportscopter Ultrasport 496

Arrow Coax
Arrow Coax Livella Uno

AutoGyro 
 AutoGyro Calidus
 AutoGyro Cavalon
 AutoGyro eCavalon
 AutoGyro MT-03

Auroa Helicopters
Auroa Helicopters Auroa

Aviaimpex 
Aviaimpex Angel

Avian 
 Avian 2/180 Gyroplane

Avicopter 
 Avicopter AC313

Avimech
Avimech Dragonfly DF-1

Aviomania
Aviomania Genesis Duo G2SA
Aviomania Genesis Solo G1SA

B

Bell Boeing 
V-22 Osprey
Quad TiltRotor

Bell Helicopter Textron 
Bell 30
Bell 47, 47J
Bell 48
Bell 61
Bell AH-1G, W, Z
Bell 201
Bell 204/205
Bell 206
Bell 207
Bell OH-58
Bell 212
Bell 214, 214ST
Bell 222/230
Bell 309
Bell 360
Bell 407
Bell ARH-70
Bell 409
Bell 412
Bell 427
Bell 429
Bell 430
Bell 505
Bell 525
Bell UH-1
Bell UH-1N, Y
Bell D-292
Bell V-247
Bell V-280
Bell XV-3
Bell XV-15
Bell X-22
Bell LHX

Bensen 
Bensen B-6
Bensen B-8
Bensen Mid-Jet
Bensen B-9
Bensen B-10
Bensen B-12

Boeing 
AH-64 Apache
RAH-66 Comanche 
CH-46 Sea Knight
CH-47 Chinook
XCH-62 HLH
Boeing Canard Rotor
Boeing Model 360
YUH-61 UTTAS

Borgward 
Borgward Kolibri

Brantly 
 Brantly B-2
 Brantly 305

Bratukhin 
Bratukhin Omega
Bratukhin B-5
Bratukhin B-11

Breguet 
Gyroplane Laboratoire
Breguet G.11E
Breguet-Richet Gyroplane

Bristol Aeroplane Company 
Bristol Sycamore
Bristol Belvedere

Buhl Aircraft Company 
 Buhl A-1 Autogyro

C

Calumet Motorsports
Calumet Snobird Explorer

Canadian Home Rotors 
 Canadian Home Rotors Safari

Celier Aviation
Celier Kiss
Celier Xenon 2
Celier Xenon 4

Cessna 
Cessna CH-1

Changhe Aircraft Industries Corporation 
 Changhe Z11
 WZ-10

Chu 
 Chu Hummingbird
 Chu CJC-3

Cicaré Helicópteros S.A. 
 Cicaré CK.1
 Cicaré CH-7
 Cicaré CH-14

Cierva Autogiro Company 

Cierva C.1
Cierva C.2
Cierva C.3
Cierva C.4
Cierva C.6
Cierva C.8
Cierva C.9
Cierva C.12
Cierva C.17
Cierva C.19
Cierva C.24
Cierva C.29
Cierva C.30A
Cierva C.40
Cierva W.5
Cierva W.9
Cierva W.11 Air Horse 
Cierva CR Twin

Continental Copters 
 El Tomcat

Cornu
 Cornu helicopter (1907)

Council for Scientific and Industrial Research 
 CSIR Experimental Autogyro II

Craft Aerotech 
 Craft Aerotech 200

D

Denel Aerospace Systems 
Denel Oryx
Denel XH-1 Alpha
Denel XTP-1 Beta
Denel Rooivalk

DF Helicopters 
DF334

Doak 
 Doak VZ-4

Doman 
Doman LZ-5

Dornier Flugzeugwerke 
Dornier Do 132
Dornier Do 32

DTA sarl
 DTA J-RO

Dynali Helicopter 
Dynali H2S
Dynali H3 Easyflyer

E

Eagle
 Eagle Helicycle

Eagle's Perch
Eagle's Perch

EDM Aerotec
EDM Aerotec CoAX 2D/2R

ELA Aviación
ELA 07
ELA 09 Junior
ELA 10 Eclipse

Engineering System
Engineering System Gen H-4

Enstrom 
 Enstrom F-28 / 280
Enstrom 480

Eurocopter Group 
 Eurocopter UH-72 Lakota
 Eurocopter BK-117 
 Eurocopter EC 130
 Eurocopter EC 135
 Eurocopter EC 145
 Eurocopter EC 155
 Eurocopter EC 175
 Eurocopter EC 225
 Eurocopter EC 635
 Eurocopter EC 725
 Eurocopter Colibri
 Eurocopter Cougar
 Eurocopter Dauphin
 Eurocopter Ecureuil
 Eurocopter Fennec
 Eurocopter Panther
 Eurocopter Super Puma
 Eurocopter Tiger
 Eurocopter X3

F

Fairchild Hiller 
 Fairchild Hiller FH-1100

Fairey Aviation 
Gyrodyne
Jet Gyrodyne
Rotodyne
Fairey Ultra-light Helicopter

Farrington Aircraft
Farrington Twinstar
Farrington 18A

Fiat 
 Fiat 7002

Filper 
Filper Beta 200

Firestone Aircraft Company 
 Firestone 45

Flettner 
Flettner Fl 184
Flettner Fl 185
Flettner Fl 265
Flettner Fl 282

Florine 
 Florine Helicopter No.3

Focke-Achgelis 
Focke-Achgelis Fa 223

Focke-Wulf 
Focke-Wulf Fw 61

Freewind Aviation
Freewind Bumble B

G

Gadfly Aircraft 
 Gadfly HDW.1

Gazda 
Gazda Helicospeeder

GEN Corporation 
GEN H-4

German Gyro Safety Aviation
German Gyro Matto

Gluhareff 
Gluhareff MEG-1X
Gluhareff MEG-2X
Gluhareff MEG-3X
Gluhareff EMG-300

Groen Brothers Aviation 
Groen Hawk H4

Guépard II Team
Guépard II XJ01

Gyrodyne Company of America 
Gyrodyne DSN DASH
Gyrodyne RON Rotorcycle

H

Hafner 
 Hafner A.R.III Gyroplane
 Hafner Rotabuggy

Harbin Aircraft Manufacturing Corporation 

Harbin Z-5 
Harbin Z-9
Harbin Z-19

Heli-Sport 
Heli-Sport CH-7 Angel
Heli-Sport CH77 Ranabot

Helicopter Engineering Research Corporation 
 Jovanovich JOV-3

Hélicoptères Guimbal 
 Guimbal Cabri G2

Helowerks 
 Helowerks HX-1 Wasp

Higgins 
Higgins EB-1

Hillberg Helicopters 
Hillberg EH1-01 RotorMouse
Hillberg Turbine Exec

Hiller Aircraft Corporation 
 Hiller UH-12/OH-23
Hiller HJ-1/YH-32
Hiller X-18
Hiller Ten99
Hiller VZ-1 Pawnee
Hiller ROE Rotorcycle

Hindustan Aeronautics Limited 
HAL Dhruv
HAL Light Utility Helicopter 
HAL Light Combat Helicopter 
HAL Cheetah 
HAL Chetak 
 HAL Rudra

Hoppi-copter 
 Pentecost HX-1 Hoppi-Copter

Hughes Helicopters 
 AH-64 Apache 
 OH-6 Cayuse 
 TH-55 Osage 
 Hughes XH-17 Flying Crane 
 Hughes-McDonnell XV-9 "Hot Cycle"

Hungaro Copter Limited
Hungaro Copter

I

Industria Aeronautică Română 
IAR 316
IAR 330

Innovator Technologies 
 Innovator Mosquito Air
 Innovator Mosquito XE

Irkut 
Irkut A-002

Italian Rotors Industries
IRI T22B
IRI T250A

K

KAI 
 Surion

Kaman Aircraft 
 Kaman K 225
 Kaman HH-43 
 Kaman K-16
 Kaman K-1125 "Huskie III"
 Kaman SH-2
 Kaman KSA-100 SAVER
 Kaman K1200 K-Max

Kamov 
Kamov Ka-8
Kamov Ka-10 
Kamov Ka-15 
Kamov Ka-18 
Kamov Ka-20 
Kamov Ka-22 
Kamov Ka-25 
Kamov Ka-26 
 Kamov Ka-27/28/29/32 
Kamov Ka-31
Kamov Ka-37
Kamov Ka-40
 Kamov Ka-50/52 
Kamov Ka-60
Kamov Ka-90
Kamov Ka-92
Kamov V-100
Kamov Ka-115
Kamov Ka-118
Kamov Ka-126
Kamov Ka-137
Kamov Ka-226

Kawasaki Heavy Industries 
Kawasaki KH-4
Kawasaki BK 117
Kawasaki OH-1

Kayaba Industry 
Kayaba Ka-1

Kazan Helicopter Plant 
Kazan Ansat

Kellett 
  Kellett K-2/3/4
 Kellett KD-1
 Kellett R-8
 Kellett R-10

Kharkiv Aviation Institute 
KhAI-24

Kinney 
 Kinney HRH

Konner Srl
Konner K1

L

Lada Land 
Lada Land VM-01

LAE Helicopters Cyprus
LAE Ultrasport 496T

Landgraf Helicopter Company 
 Landgraf H-2

Léger
 Léger machine

Leineweber 
 Leineweber 1921 Helicopter

Little Wing Autogyros, Inc.
Little Wing LW-1
Little Wing Roto-Pup

Lockheed 
Lockheed AH-56 Cheyenne
Lockheed CL-475
Lockheed XH-51
Lockheed Martin VH-71 Kestrel

M

Manzolini 
 Manzolini Libellula

Marenco Swisshelicopter 
 SKYe SH09

MATRA 
 MATRA-Cantinieau MC-101

McCulloch Autogyro 
McCulloch J-2

McDonnell 
McDonnell XV-1

McDonnell Douglas
 MH-6 Little Bird
MD 500
MD 500 Defender
MD 600
MD Explorer

Messerschmitt-Bölkow-Blohm 

Bölkow Bo 46
Bölkow Bo 102 Heli Trainer
Bölkow Bo 103
MBB Bo 105
MBB/Kawasaki BK 117

Midwest Engineering & Design
Midwest Hornet
Midwest Zodiac Talon-Turbine

Mil Helicopters 
Mil Mi-1 
Mil Mi-2
Mil Mi-4 
Mil Mi-6 
Mil V-7
Mil Mi-8 
Mil Mi-10
Mil Mi-12 
Mil Mi-14 
Mil V-16
Mil Mi-17 
Mil Mi-24/25/35 
Mil Mi-26 
Mil Mi-28 
Mil Mi-30
Mil Mi-34 
Mil Mi-36
Mil Mi-38
Mil Mi-52
Mil Mi-X1 (Mi-Kh1)

Millennium Helicopter
 Millennium MH-1

Mitsubishi Heavy Industries 
Mitsubishi MH2000

N

Nagler 
Nagler NH-160

NASA/JPL 
Mars Helicopter Ingenuity

Nederlandse Helikopter Industrie 
 NHI H-3 Kolibrie

NHIndustries 
NHI NH90

Niki Rotor Aviation
 Niki 2004
 Niki Lightning
 Niki Kallithea

Nord 
Nord N.1700

Northrop Grumman 
MQ-8 Fire Scout

Nova Sp. z.o.o.
Nova Coden

P

Panha 
Panha 2091

Pawnee Aviation 
Pawnee Chief
Pawnee Warrior

Pentecost
 Pentecost HX-1 Hoppi-Copter

Petróczy-Kármán-Žurovec 
 PKZ-1

Philippine Aerospace Development Corporation
 PADC Hummingbird

Phoenix Rotorcraft
Phoenix Skyblazer

Piasecki Helicopter 
Piasecki HRP-1
Piasecki PV-2
Piasecki HUP
Piasecki H-16 Pathfinder
Piasecki H-21
Piasecki 59 Airgeep
Piasecki X-49
Piasecki PA-97

Pitcairn 
Pitcairn PA-18 
Pitcairn PA-19 
Pitcairn PAA-1 
Pitcairn PCA-2

Platt-LePage Aircraft Co 
Platt-LePage XR-1

PZL 
PZL W-3 Sokół
PZL SM-4 Latka
PZL SW-4
PZL Kania

R

Raven Rotorcraft
Raven Explorer I
Raven Explorer II

Redback Aviation
Redback Buzzard

Revolution Helicopter Corporation 
 Revolution Mini-500

Robinson Helicopter 
Robinson R22 
Robinson R44 
Robinson R66

Rotorcraft Ltd 
 Cierva CR-Twin

Rotorschmiede
Rotorschmiede VA115

RotorSport UK Ltd 
 RotorSport UK Calidus
 RotorSport UK MT-03

RotorWay International 
 RotorWay Elite
 RotorWay Exec 162F
 RotorWay Scorpion
 RotorWay A600 Talon
 RotorWay 300T Eagle

Rotorwing-Aero
Rotorwing-Aero 3D-RV

Russian Gyroplanes
Russian Gyroplanes Gyros-1 Farmer
Russian Gyroplanes Gyros-2 Smartflier

S

Santos-Dumont
 Santos-Dumont helicopter

Saunders 
Saunders Helicogyre

Saunders Roe 
Saro Skeeter
Saro P.531

Scheutzow 
Scheutzow B

Schweizer Aircraft Corporation 
Schweizer 300
 Schweizer 330/333

Shaanxi Baojii Special Vehicles Manufacturing Company
Shaanxi Baojii Special Vehicles Lie Ying Falcon

Shahed Aviation Industries Research Center 
HESA Shahed 278
HESA Shahed 285

Showers-Aero
Showers Skytwister Choppy

Sikorsky Aircraft Corporation 
Vought-Sikorsky VS-300
Sikorsky R-4
Sikorsky R-5
Sikorsky R-6
Sikorsky H-19 (S-55)
Sikorsky CH-37 Mojave 
Sikorsky H-34 (S-58) 
Sikorsky XH-39 
MH-53J Pave Low 
Sikorsky S-60
Sikorsky UH-3 Sea King 
Sikorsky S-62
Sikorsky CH-54 Tarhe (S-64)
CH-53 Sea Stallion
Sikorsky S-67
Sikorsky S-69
Sikorsky S-70 UH-60, HH-60, SH-60
Sikorsky S-72 
Sikorsky S-75 
Sikorsky S-76
CH-53E Super Stallion 
Sikorsky S-92 
 CH-148 Cyclone
Sikorsky S-97 Raider
RAH-66 Comanche 
Sikorsky X2
Sikorsky Cypher

Silvercraft Italiana 
Silvercraft SH-4

SKT Swiss Kopter Technology SA
SKT Skyrider 06

SkyCruiser Autogyro
SkyCruiser Autogyro SkyCruiser

SNCAC 
 SNCAC NC.2001

SNCASE 
SNCASE SE-3110

SNCASO 
 Sud-Ouest Ariel
 Sud-Ouest Djinn

Spitfire Helicopter Company 
 Spitfire Helicopters Spitfire Mk.I 
 Spitfire Helicopters Spitfire Mk.II Tigershark

Star Aviation Inc|Star Aviation 
Star Aviation LoneStar Sport Helicopter

Sznycer 
Sznycer SG-VI-D
Sznycer Omega BS-12

T

Titanium Auto Gyro
Titanium Explorer

Transcendental Aircraft Corporation 
Transcendental 1-G

Trendak
Trendak Tercel

Trixy Aviation Products
Trixy G 4-2 R
Trixy Liberty
Trixy Princess
Trixy Trixformer

TsAGI 
 TsAGI A-4

Turkish Aerospace Industries 
 TAI/AgustaWestland T-129
 TAI T-625

V

Vertical
Vertical Hummingbird

Villamil
 Villamil Libélula Viblandi

Volocopter
Volocopter VC2
Volocopter 2X

Vortech
 Vortech A/W 95
 Vortech Choppy
 Vortech G-1
 Vortech Hot Rod
 Vortech Kestrel Jet
 Vortech Meg-2XH Strap-On
 Vortech Skylark
 Vortech Shadow
 Vortech Sparrow

W

Wagner 
Wagner Aerocar

Westland Helicopters 
Westland Apache 
Westland Dragonfly
Westland Gazelle
Westland Lynx
Westland Sea King
Westland Scout
Westland Wasp
Westland Wessex
Westland Westminster
Westland Whirlwind
Westland Widgeon

Windspire Inc.
Windspire Aeros

Winner SBS
Winner B150

Wombat Gyrocopters
Wombat Gyrocopters Wombat

Y

Yakovlev 
Yakovlev EG
Yakovlev Yak-24 
Yakovlev Yak-60
Yakovlev Yak-100
Yakovlev VVP-6

Youngcopter 
 Youngcopter Neo

Notes 

US Army helicopters designations:

 AH: Attack Helicopter
 CH: Cargo Helicopter
 OH: Observation Helicopter
 RAH: Reconnaissance and Attack Helicopter
 UH: Utility Helicopter

Project acronyms
 AAH: Advanced Attack Helicopter

See also 
 List of helicopter airlines
 List of tilt-rotor craft
 List of United States military helicopters
 List of utility helicopters

References

External links

Lists of aircraft by design configuration